Rudi Požeg Vancaš (born 15 March 1994) is a Slovenian footballer who plays for Slovenian PrvaLiga side Koper as a midfielder.

Career
On 25 April 2022, Tobol announced the signing of Vancaš, with his departure being confirmed on 30 June 2022 after his contract had expired.

References

External links
NZS profile 
 

1994 births
Living people
Sportspeople from Novo Mesto
Slovenian footballers
Slovenia youth international footballers
Slovenia under-21 international footballers
Slovenia international footballers
Association football midfielders
Association football wingers
NK Domžale players
NK Celje players
NK Maribor players
FC Chornomorets Odesa players
FC Tobol players
FC Koper players
Slovenian PrvaLiga players
Kazakhstan Premier League players
Slovenian expatriate footballers
Expatriate footballers in Ukraine
Slovenian expatriate sportspeople in Ukraine
Expatriate footballers in Kazakhstan